Dan Biocchi is a Canadian politician and reserve member of the Canadian 4 x 100m relay team at the 1976 Olympic Games. He was a candidate in the 2004 Canadian federal election and has advocated for proportional representation and Latin American issues.

Biocchi was born November 28, 1955 in Buenos Aires, Argentina. He emigrated to Montreal, Quebec in August 1962.

Biocchi received a master's degree in political science from the University of Alberta. He taught political science at McGill University and Marianopolis College in Montreal while working on his doctorate at McGill. He has been a Latin American correspondent with Associated Press.

Biocchi is the founder of the Ottawa chapter of Fair Vote Canada, an organization that lobbies for proportional representation. In the 1980s, he was a member of the Latin American Solidarity Community, assisting Chilean refugees in Canada after escaping the dictatorship of Augusto Pinochet.

Politically, Biocchi was the Green Party of Canada's citizenship and immigration critic during the 2004 federal election, running as their candidate in the riding of Ottawa—Orléans.  He placed fourth out of four candidates, with 2,699 votes (4.6% of the total).  The winning candidate was the Liberal Party of Canada's Marc Godbout.   Biocchi was a candidate in the Cumberland Ward in Ottawa's 2006 municipal election, placing third.

External links 
 Dan Biocchi: Profile

 "Pierrefonds Biocchi Reflects on Life at the Olympic Village"- NorthShore News, July 15, 1976.

1955 births
Living people
Argentine people of Italian descent
Argentine emigrants to Canada
Canadian politicians of Italian descent
Canadian sportspeople of Italian descent
Canadian sportsperson-politicians
Green Party of Canada candidates in the 2004 Canadian federal election
Naturalized citizens of Canada
Athletes from Buenos Aires
Canadian male sprinters